Dilyana Popova (born 24 September 1981) is a Bulgarian actress and model. Born in Gulyantsi, she lived there until grade 8 when she relocated to Pleven. Popova subsequently studied modelling design at New Bulgarian University.

In 2010, she was photographed for the Bulgarian version of Playboy magazine. Popova has appeared in the film Love.net, the film series Glass Home and also had a role in the drama and romantic series Revolutcia Z. In 2014, she officialized her relationship with fellow actor Asen Blatechki, with whom she has a son named Boril.

References

External links
 

1981 births
21st-century Bulgarian actresses
Bulgarian film actresses
Bulgarian female models
Living people
People from Pleven Province